The Village  is a BBC television series written by Peter Moffat. The drama is set in a Derbyshire village in the early 20th century. The first series of what Moffat hoped would become a 42-hour televised drama following an extended family through the 20th century, was broadcast in spring 2013 and covered the years 1914 to 1920. A second series was broadcast in autumn 2014, and continued the story into the 1920s. The programme did not return after the second series.

Plot
The Village tells the story of life in a Derbyshire village through the eyes of a central character, Bert Middleton. Bert has been portrayed as a boy by Bill Jones, as a teen by Alfie Stewart, as a young man by Tom Varey, and as an old man by David Ryall. John Simm plays Bert's father John Middleton, an abusive, alcoholic Peak District farmer, and Maxine Peake plays Bert's mother, Grace.

Writer Peter Moffat has spoken of wanting to create 'a British Heimat, alluding to Edgar Reitz's epic German saga Heimat, which followed one extended family in a region of the Rhineland from 1919 to 2000. Unlike Downton Abbey, this version of history is a working-class history—"domestics are expected to face the walls when the master walks by".

Production
The first series was filmed in and around Hayfield, Edale, Glossop, Chapel-en-le-Frith and Charlesworth in the Peak District, and in the grounds of Tatton Park in Cheshire, during October to December 2012. The four first episodes were directed by Antonia Bird, her last work before her death the same year.

John Simm used local historian Margaret Wombwell's book Milk, Muck and Memories in his research for how the farmers from the period lived, and Moffat researched locally and at the Imperial War Museum.

On 28 April 2013 the BBC Media Centre reported that "BBC One's critically acclaimed epic Sunday night drama series starring Maxine Peake and John Simm will return with six more episodes next year." The second and final series began filming at the end of March 2014 in Derbyshire. The stately home and grounds at Lyme Park were used as a new filming location. It was confirmed by cast members on Twitter that filming for the second series had wrapped on 4 July 2014.

Main cast

John Simm as John Middleton 
Maxine Peake as Grace Middleton
Bill Jones as Bert Middleton (aged 12)
Alfie Stewart as Bert (aged 18)
Tom Varey as Bert (aged 21)
David Ryall as Old Bert
Nico Mirallegro as Joe Middleton
Charlie Murphy as Martha Lane
Juliet Stevenson as Clem Allingham
Augustus Prew as George Allingham
Emily Beecham as Caro Allingham
Rupert Evans as Edmund Allingham
Kit Jackson as Lord Allingham
Matt Stokoe as Gerard Eyre
Stephen Walters as Crispin Ingham
Ainsley Howard as Norma Greaves
Annabelle Apsion as Margaret Boden
Anthony Flanagan as Arnold Hankin
Chloe Harris as Agnes
Scott Handy as Robin Lane
Joe Duttine as Rutter
Amelia Young as Polly
Jim Cartwright as Peter the Landlord
Joe Armstrong as Stephen Bairstow
Julian Sands as Lord Kilmartin
Derek Riddell as Bill Gibby
Juliet Aubrey as Joy Dangerfield
Andrew Gower as Gilbert Hankin
Phoebe Dynevor as Phoebe Rundle
Matthew James Lowe as Phoebe's brother aged 8
William George Lowe as Phoebe's brother aged 7 
Lucy Brown as Harriet Kilmartin
Ben Batt as Alf Rutter
Daniel Ezra as Ghana Jones
Chloe Rowley as Mary Middleton
Luke Williams as Paul Boden
Alex Robertson as Robert Read

Episodes

Series 1 (2013)

Series 2 (2014)

ReceptionFirst seriesThe Village received mainly positive reviews after the first episode; the Independent said "the story was ostensibly small and specific", but "then it opened up, cinematically, to the world beyond with panoramic shots of the English countryside – vast acres of fields, hills and sky. These suddenly striking images gave it an epic quality". The Telegraph remarked on the authenticity of scenes, commending how "The Village refused to foist contemporary relevance on its audience" and describing it as "the most accomplished new drama of the year so far".

The first series of The Village received three BAFTA nominations in the categories of Best Drama Series, Leading Actress for Maxine Peake and Supporting Actor for Nico Mirallegro.Second series'''
Before the second series aired, the Daily Telegraph reported that the new series would be more light-hearted. The Guardian was more positive, saying that although the new series was still "bleak as bleak...Peter Moffat's bold idea of creating an epic 42-part saga documenting 20th-century rural England through one Peak District community begins to make sense and take on a new importance." The Telegraph'' review was less positive than for the first series, saying it "has its moments but the end result is muddled" and giving it a two out of five rating.

DVD
A Region 2 DVD of series one was released by Entertainment One on 8 July 2013. A Region 2 DVD of series two was released 9 March 2015.

Notes
 A new recording of "I Vow to Thee, My Country" by Beck Goldsmith is used for the trailer soundtrack.

References

External links 

BBC Media Centre – The Village
BBC Press Pack – The Village

2013 British television series debuts
2014 British television series endings
2010s British drama television series
BBC television dramas
BBC high definition shows
Television shows set in Derbyshire
English-language television shows
Television series by All3Media
Television series set in the 1910s
Television series set in the 1920s
Fiction set in 1914
Fiction set in 1915
Fiction set in 1916
Fiction set in 1920
Fiction set in 1923